The Alive Tour was Jessie J's first arena tour. The tour consisted of 19 arena dates.

Background 

In May 2012 Jessie announced via Twitter that she would be setting off on a UK tour in late February 2013 and would finish in late March of the same year. Due to recording her second album and shooting The Voice UK.
The tour was postponed until early October 2013 and to end in early November. Jessie stated on her official Twitter page: "I would like to be the first to tell that you that my nice to meet you tour has been rescheduled to later next year. I am honestly truly sorry but I hope you all can understand that its just because I would like to take more time to finish my new album. I promise to make the show my biggest and best ever and cannot wait for you all to hear my new songs." Tickets were transferable for the rescheduled dates and extra tour dates were added due to high demand. The tour was originally named 'Nice To Meet You' however due to the release of her second album Alive the tour was renamed 'Alive'. On 12 October 2013 Jessie did a dress rehearsal for a few lucky fans who has the privilege to watch. The stage setting included 5 LED screens, a large door at the back of the stage, a rising platform, platforms for her band, a large catwalk; which encircles the stage—separating the very important heartbeats for the main audience. It was announced on 14 October that Lawson would be supporting Jessie at all dates except Birmingham, Sheffield and Aberdeen which would be supported by Neon Jungle.

Critical response 

The Alive tour was met with mixed reviews: some stating the show was a "powerhouse", others claiming the "video interludes took away from what could have been an amazing show." Writing for The Daily Telegraph, Alice Vincent gave the show three stars, feeling that "Jessie belted out songs like a force of nature", and opined that it was "these deliciously retro moments which worked best in J's show. She gave us a fun, breezy rendition of Daydreamin’." Vincent went on to summarize, "Alive was a show to please all ages, and for that it should be commended." The Belfast Telegraph gave the show four stars stating: "Always keen to provide a positive role model, there were lots of mini motivational speeches and words of encouragement and no evidence of any sleazy Miley Cyrus-type antics." The Belfast Telegraph finally stated that Jessie was "A class act – who was more than worth the wait." Sam Rigby at Digital Spy gave the show four stars and said "The sentimental messages of 'love who you are' and 'live life to the full' may have been overused during the 90-minute show but it is only a small complaint in what was a momentous night in Jessie J's career. Despite the focus on Jessie's voice, it didn't come at the expense of a visually pleasing production."

Special guests 
 Lawson (support act for all dates except Birmingham, Sheffield, and Aberdeen)
 Neon Jungle (support act for Birmingham and Sheffield dates only)
 Olivia Somerlyn

Set list 

Phase 1 – 'Awake'

 "Big White Room"
 "Thunder"
 "Breathe"

Phase 2 – 'Love'

 "Sexy Lady"
 "Domino"
 "Daydreamin'"
 "LaserLight"

Phase 3 – 'Instinct'

 "Excuse My Rude''
 "Do It like a Dude"
 "Nobody's Perfect"
 "Wild"

Phase 4 – 'Value'

 "Who You Are"
 "Conquer The World"
 "Harder We Fall"

Phase 5 – 'Energy'

 "Gold"
 "Alive"
 "Price Tag"
 "It's My Party"

Tour dates

Box office score data

Notes

References 

Jessie J
2013 concert tours